Kubra is a rural locality (a selo) and the administrative centre of Kubrinsky Selsoviet, Laksky District, Republic of Dagestan, Russia. The population was 197 as of 2010. There is 1 street.

Geography 
Kubra is located 6 km southwest of Kumukh (the district's administrative centre) by road. Gushchi and Chitur are the nearest rural localities.

Nationalities 
Laks live there.

References 

Rural localities in Laksky District